Jean Feller (16 October 1919 – 1 January 1997) was a Luxembourgian footballer. He competed in the men's tournament at the 1948 Summer Olympics.

References

External links
 

1919 births
1997 deaths
Luxembourgian footballers
Luxembourg international footballers
Olympic footballers of Luxembourg
Footballers at the 1948 Summer Olympics
People from Kayl
Association football defenders
FC Rodange 91 players